Fair Oaks, Virginia may refer to:
Fair Oaks, Fairfax County, Virginia (census-designated place)
Fair Oaks, Henrico County, Virginia (unincorporated community)

See also
Battle of Fair Oaks, fought in Henrico County, Virginia
Fair Oaks (disambiguation)